Amelanchier sanguinea, known as red-twigged shadbush or roundleaf serviceberry, is a shrub native to eastern and central North America. Its native range stretches from New Brunswick to Saskatchewan south as far as northern Georgia. It is most common in eastern Canada, the northeastern United States, and the Great Lakes region.

Like all Amelanchier fruit, these resemble berries, but are technically pomes.

Varieties
 Amelanchier sanguinea var. gaspensis Wiegand  
 Amelanchier sanguinea var. grandiflora (Wiegand) Rehder 
 Amelanchier sanguinea var. sanguinea

References

External links

 

sanguinea
Flora of Eastern Canada
Plants used in Native American cuisine
Trees of the United States
Plants described in 1813
Flora of the North-Central United States
Flora of the Northeastern United States
Flora of the Southeastern United States
Flora of Saskatchewan
Flora without expected TNC conservation status